Lipót, or Leopold (in German), Klug (23 January 1854 – 24 March 1945) was a Jewish-Hungarian mathematician, professor in the Franz Joseph University of Kolozsvár.

Life and work 
Klug attended the gymnasium of his hometown and entered in the university of Budapest in 1872 where he graduated as docent in 1874. Between 1874 and 1893 he taught mathematics in the high school of Pozsony (now Bratislava in Slovakia). From 1893 to 1897 he was professor in a secondary school in Budapest and he obtained his habilitation in the university of Budapest. In 1897 he was appointed professor of geometry in the University of Kolozsvár. He retired in 1917 and moved back to Budapest.

He died in 1944 or 1945 in strange circumstances: in the middle of the Second world war and aged ninety-one years, he walked out of his home in Budapest and he never came back. Probably he was the victim of racial hate because he was of Jewish descent.

His work was greatly influenced by Gyula König. His areas of research were descriptive geometry and synthetic geometry. During his retirement in Budapest he encouraged the young Edward Teller (the father of the hydrogen bomb).

See also
List of unsolved deaths

References

Bibliography

External links 

1854 births
1945 deaths
19th-century Hungarian mathematicians
20th-century Hungarian mathematicians
Hungarian Jews
Unsolved deaths